Tantima is a municipality located in the montane central zone in the State of Veracruz, about 220 km from state capital Xalapa. It has a surface of 267.32 km2. It is a village huasteco very ancient; the name is given of it steals of producing tree of a few fruits known also like sacuates or jícaras. Previously it was including a great extension of territory, but in 1872 Citlaltépetl's municipality is raised and in 1875 that of Tamalín, segregating both territories of Tantima's municipality.

Toponymy
The word Tantima may come from the huastec or nahuatl languages: tan (place) and tima (a kind of tree).

Geographic Limits

The municipality of  Tantima  is delimited to the north by Ozuluama, to the north, east and south by Tamalín, to the south-east by Chinampa de Gorostiza, and to the south by Tancoco. It is watered by small creeks that form Cuchapas's tideland, which ends in the Lagoon Tamiahua.

Agriculture

It produces principally maize, beans, watermelon and orange fruit.

Celebrations

In  Tantima , in October takes place the celebration in honor to San Francisco de Asís. Virgen de la Candelaria, Patron of the town, and in December takes place the celebration in honor to Virgen de Guadalupe.

Weather

The weather in  Tantima  is very warm all year with rains in summer and autumn.

References

External links 

  Municipal Official webpage
  Municipal Official Information

Municipalities of Veracruz